Fountains Earth is a civil parish in Harrogate district, North Yorkshire, England.  The principal village in the parish is Lofthouse, and the parish also includes the hamlet of Bouthwaite and the northern part of the village of Wath. The population of the parish in the 2011 census was 197.

The parish occupies the eastern side of upper Nidderdale.  It is bounded on the west by the River Nidd and Gouthwaite Reservoir, which separate the parish from Stonebeck Up and Stonebeck Down.  In Wath, at the southern end of the parish, a stream known as Dauber Gill separates the parish from High and Low Bishopside.   To the north and east large areas of grouse moor extend into the neighbouring parishes of Ilton cum Pott and Laverton.

Historically Fountains Earth was a township in the ancient parish of Kirkby Malzeard in the West Riding of Yorkshire.  The township took its name from Fountains Abbey, which owned the land in the Middle Ages and established granges at Lofthouse, Bouthwaite and other places in the township.  Fountains Earth became a civil parish in 1866, and in 1974 became part of the new Harrogate district in North Yorkshire.  The parish now shares the Upper Nidderdale grouped parish council with the parishes of Stonebeck Down and Stonebeck Up.

References

External links

Civil parishes in North Yorkshire
Nidderdale